Dharmavaram revenue division (or Dharmavaram division) is a Revenue division in the Sri Sathya Sai district of the Indian state of Andhra Pradesh. It is one of the 4 revenue divisions in the district with 7 mandals under its administration.

Administration 
There are 7 mandals administered under Dharmavaram revenue division.  Their headquarters  are:

See also 
List of revenue divisions in Andhra Pradesh

References 

Revenue divisions in Sri Sathya Sai district